The 1908 North Carolina Tar Heels football team represented the University of North Carolina in the 1908 college football season. The team captain of the 1908 season was Romy Story.

Schedule

References

External links
 

North Carolina
North Carolina Tar Heels football seasons
North Carolina Tar Heels football